This is the List of municipalities in Çankırı Province, Turkey .

References 

Geography of Çankırı Province
Cankiri